Velké Svatoňovice is a municipality and village in Trutnov District in the Hradec Králové Region of the Czech Republic. It has about 1,300 inhabitants.

Administrative parts
The village of Markoušovice is an administrative part of Velké Svatoňovice.

References

External links

 

Villages in Trutnov District